Loranger is a surname. Notable people with the surname include:

Del Loranger (1920–2003), American basketball player and coach
Diane Loranger (1920–2004), Canadian geologist and paleontologist
Louis-Onésime Loranger (1837–1917), Canadian lawyer, politician and judge
Thomas-Jean-Jacques Loranger (1823–1885), Canadian judge and politician

See also
 Loranger, Michigan, a former community 
 Edward Loranger House